Singri is a village in Sonitpur district in the Indian state of Assam. It is situated in the bank of the Brahmaputra river. It is known for Singri Tea Estate and Gupteshwar Temple as well as the ancient ruins of Vishwakarma Temple.

History 
Singri has been a pilgrimage site for Tibetans and Bhutanese since the 14th century, as mentioned by Jigme Lingpa in the 18th century.

Demographics 
The tea estate and its adjacent settlements are inhabited mostly by tea-garden workers. According to data of Census of India, 2011, Singri has a population of 3,722 including 1,897 males and 1,825 females. 1,172 are workers, including 1,032 males and 140 females.

Singri Tea Estate 
Singri Tea Estate is run by Hoograjuli Assam Tea Co and provides the bulk of jobs in the area. A factory and an adjacent office are present.

Gupteswar temple 
Gupteshwar Temple is located along the bank of river Brahmaputra.  People from around Assam and abroad come to Gupteshwar Temple during Maha Shivratri. It is a prehistoric temple of lord Shiva. While the Sringhi Rishi was meditating in the Singri hills, the rakshasas became jealous and chased him. He entered a pool to hide. Tinali Center lies downhill of guptshwar. 

A large fair with attractions and a circus takes place during the temple's annual festival.

Vishwakarma temple (ruins) 
Various sculptures and carvings of the walls are present in the temple ruins. A fair takes place during the annual festival of Vishwakarma.

References 

Sonitpur district